The 2007 South American Cross Country Championships took place on February 25, 2007.  The races were held at the Centro de Treinamento da Marinha in Rio de Janeiro, Brazil.  A detailed report of the event was given for the IAAF.

Complete results and results for junior and youth competitions were published.

Medallists

Race results

Senior men's race (12 km)

Note: Athletes in parentheses did not score for the team result.  (n/s: nonscorer)

Junior (U20) men's race (8 km)

Note: Athletes in parentheses did not score for the team result.  (n/s: nonscorer)

Youth (U18) men's race (4 km)

Note: Athletes in parentheses did not score for the team result.  (n/s: nonscorer)

Senior women's race (8 km)

†: Guest athlete.

Note: Athletes in parentheses did not score for the team result.  (n/s: nonscorer)

Junior (U20) women's race (6 km)

Note: Athletes in parentheses did not score for the team result.  (n/s: nonscorer)

Youth (U18) women's race (3 km)

Note: Athletes in parentheses did not score for the team result.  (n/s: nonscorer)

Medal table (unofficial)

Note: Totals include both individual and team medals, with medals in the team competition counting as one medal.

Participation
According to an unofficial count, 86 athletes (+ 1 guest) from 10 countries participated.

 (9 + 1 guest)
 (2)
 (22)
 (10)
 (8)
 (3)
 (10)
 Perú (8)
 (4)
 (10)

See also
 2007 in athletics (track and field)

References

South American Cross Country Championships
South American Cross Country Championships
South American Cross Country Championships
South American Cross Country Championships
South American Cross Country Championships
Cross country running in Brazil
2000s in Rio de Janeiro
Athletics in Rio de Janeiro (city)
February 2007 sports events in South America